The Chinese Ambassador to Spain is the official representative of the People's Republic of China to Spain.

List of representatives

See also
China–Spain relations

References 

Ambassadors of China to Spain
Spain
China